Dr. Chud's X-Ward is an American horror punk band, formed in 2003 after Dr. Chud folded his other band Graves. Their first album, Diagnosis for Death, was released in 2004 on Dr. Chud's own Bloodwork Records label. The first 1,000 copies of the album were limited edition and were signed, numbered and came with a free vinyl sticker. In 2005, it was released on purple vinyl. Only 1,250 copies were released. Every Halloween, the band goes on tour.

Members

Current line-up as of October 2019 
Dr. Chud – vocals
The Fish – guitar
Al X – drums
Sal Bee – bass

Past tour members 

Dr. Placebo – drums
The Murp – drums
Robby Bloodshed – guitar
Argyle Goolsby – bass
Sal Bee – bass
Mark Danger – bass
Rebeckah Nurse – guitar
Fish – guitar
Voodoo Quiz – guitar
MDFE – guitar
Alx – drums
Matt Bergman – bass
John Glancy – guitar
Chad Wells – drums
Nurse Knollwood – guitar

Discography 

Diagnosis for Death (2004)

External links 
 
 

Punk rock groups from New Jersey
Horror punk groups
Bands with fictional stage personas
Musical groups established in 2003